"High on Your Love" is a 1980 disco/dance single by Debbie Jacobs.  Along with the track "Hot, Hot (Give It All You Got)" "High on Your Love" spent one week at number one on the disco/dance chart.  "High on Your Love" peaked at number 70 on the Billboard Hot 100 pop chart.

References

1980 singles
Disco songs
1980 songs
Songs written by Paul Sabu